The Jadar mining project is a proposed mining site. The deposit is one of the largest lithium deposits in the world and also contains boron. It is planned that both lithium and boron will be recovered from the ore.  The deposit contains the mineral jadarite, the only occurrence of this mineral in the world. The mine is located in western Serbia in Mačva District.  The Jadar mine has reserves amounting to 118 million tonnes of ore grading 1.8% lithium oxide  The deposit was discovered in 2004 and in 2017 the Rio Tinto Group planned to start mining operations in 2023.

References 

Lithium mines in Serbia